The table below lists the judgments of the Constitutional Court of South Africa delivered in 2015.

The members of the court at the start of 2015 were Chief Justice Mogoeng Mogoeng, Deputy Chief Justice Dikgang Moseneke, and judges Edwin Cameron, Johan Froneman, Chris Jafta, Sisi Khampepe, Mbuyiseli Madlanga, Bess Nkabinde, Johann van der Westhuizen and Raymond Zondo. One seat was vacant due to the retirement of judge Thembile Skweyiya in May 2014. At various stages Achmat Jappie, Elias Matojane, Mahube Molemela, Monica Leeuw, Robert Nugent, Leona Theron, Zukisa Tshiqi, and Malcolm Wallis acted on the Court.

References

 

2015
Constitutional Court